Brian Kierulf is a songwriter and producer from the United States. He usually writes songs with Joshua M. Schwartz. They are a part of KNS Productions.

Selected discography
Aaron Carter - album Oh Aaron
"Oh Aaron" (Written by Andy Goldmark, Joshua M. Schwarts, Brian Kierulf) - 3:17.

Aaron Carter - album Aaron's Party (Come Get It)
"Aaron's Party (Come Get It)" (Written by Brian Kierulf, Joshua M. Schwartz) - 3:24.
"That's How I Beat Shaq" (Written by Brian Kierulf, Joshua M. Schwartz) - 3:25.

Mike Posner - album At Night, Alone
"In The Arms Of A Stranger (Brian Kierulf Remix)" (Written by Mike Posner)- 4:16.

Secret Weapons - album Secret Weapons
"Power" (Written by Danny Rocco, Gerry Lange, Brian Kierulf)- 3:26.
"konnichiwild" (Written by Danny Rocco, Gerry Lange, Brian Kierulf)- 3:25.

Jana Kramer - album Thirty One
"Just Like In The Movies" (Written by Jana Kramer, Brian Kierulf)- 3:26.

Lady Gaga - album The Fame
"Summerboy" (Written by Lady Gaga, Brian Kierulf, Joshua M. Schwartz. Produced by Brian Kierulf and Joshua M. Schwartz for KNS Productions) - 4:16.

Ricki-Lee Coulter - album Fear & Freedom
 "Do It Like That" (Brian Kierulf, Joshua M. Schwartz) 2:46
 "Never Let Go" (Brian Kierulf, Joshua M. Schwartz) 3:49
 "Left to Right" (Brian Kierulf, Joshua M. Schwartz)

Leon Thomas III ft. Victoria Justice - album Victorious: Soundtrack
"Song2you"

50 Cent featuring Beyonce - album Get Rich or Die Tryin'
 "Thug Love" (Brian Kierulf, Joshua M. Schwartz) 3:14

Backstreet Boys - album Black & Blue
 "Yes I Will" (Brian Kierulf, Joshua M. Schwartz, A.J. McLean) 3:51

Britney Spears - compilation album Platinum Christmas
 "My Only Wish (This Year)" (Brian Kierulf, Joshua M. Schwartz) 4:15

Britney Spears - compilation album The Singles Collection (The Deluxe Edition)
 "Intimidated" (Britney Spears, Rodney Jerkins, Brian Kierulf, Joshua M. Schwartz) 3:17

Britney Spears - album Britney
 "Lonely" (Jerkins, Brian Kierulf, Joshua M. Schwartz, Spears) 3:19
 "Anticipating" (Brian Kierulf, Joshua M. Schwartz, Spears) 3:16
 "Let Me Be" (Brian Kierulf, Joshua M. Schwartz, Spears) 2:51
 "That's Where You Take Me" (Brian Kierulf, Joshua M. Schwartz, Spears) 3:32
 "Before the Goodbye" [Non-U.S. edition only] (Brian Kierulf, Joshua M. Schwartz, Spears, B Transeau) 3:50
 "I Run Away" (Brian Kierulf, Joshua M. Schwartz) 4:04
 "When I Say So" [Unreleased Track]

Britney Spears - album In the Zone
"Brave New Girl" (Britney Spears, Brian Kierulf, Joshua M. Schwartz, Kara DioGuardi) (Produced by Brian Kierulf & Joshua M. Schwartz) 3:30
"Don't Hang Up" (Britney Spears, Joshua M Schwartz, Brian Kierulf) 4:02

Nick Carter - album Now or Never
"Stand for You" (Nick Carter/Brian Kierulf/Joshua M. Schwartz. Produced by Brian Kierulf and Joshua M. Schwartz for KNS Productions.
"Do I Have To Cry for You"  (Nick Carter/Brian Kierulf/Joshua M. Schwartz. Produced by Brian Kierulf and Joshua M. Schwartz for KNS Productions.
"Girls in the USA featuring Mr.Vegas" - (Nick Carter/Brian Kierulf/Joshua M. Schwartz. Produced by Steve Mac for Rokstone Productions.

Willa Ford - album Willa Was Here
"I Wanna Be Bad" (featuring Royce da 5'9") (Willa Ford, Brian Kierulf, Joshua M. Schwartz, Royce da 5'9") – 3:06
"Somebody Take the Pain Away" (Brian Kierulf, Joshua M. Schwartz, Sheron Lee, Annie Lennox, David Alan Stewart) – 2:53

2gether - album 2Gether
"U + Me = Us (Calculus)"
"The hardest part of breaking up"
"Rub One Out"

Tarkan - album Come Closer
Why Don't We (Aman Aman)
Start The Fire
Don't Leave Me Alone
Shikidim

Jeannie Ortega - album No Place Like BKLYN
"Let It Go"

Gia Farrell - album Happy Feet
"Hit me up"

Forever the Sickest Kids - album The Weekend: Friday
"Hip Hop Chick"

3LW - album 3LW
"Gettin Too Heavy"
"I'm Gonna Make You Miss Me"
"Fallin' for You"

Ricki-Lee Coulter - album Brand New Day
"Can't Touch It" (Brian Kierulf, Joshua M. Schwartz)

LaTangela Newsome - Taina Original TV Soundtrack
 I Represent (Brian Kierulf, Nate Butler, Joshua M. Schwartz)

References

Year of birth missing (living people)
Living people
American male songwriters
Place of birth missing (living people)